Balacra jaensis is a moth of the family Erebidae. It was described by George Thomas Bethune-Baker in 1927. It is found in Cameroon and the Democratic Republic of the Congo.

The wingspan is about 57 mm. The forewings are very pale ochreous, with the neuration prominently darkish brown, and a brownish subapical cloud, as well as a darker cloud below the basal part of vein two, extending onto the inner margin. The hindwings are white and subhyaline.

References

Balacra
Moths described in 1927
Insects of Cameroon
Insects of the Democratic Republic of the Congo
Erebid moths of Africa